Panya Pradabsri (born: 21 February 1991), known by his ring name Petchmanee CP Freshmart (previously Petchmanee Kokietgym), is a Thai professional boxer who has held the WBC mini-flyweight title since 2020.

As of September 2021, Pradabsri is ranked the best strawweight in the world by BoxRec, the #2 strawweight boxer in the world by TBRB, and The Ring, while ESPN ranks him at #4.

Professional career

Background
He had more than 200 Muay Thai fights under the name "Porha Exindecongym" (ป.ห้า เอ็กซินดิคอนยิม). Later, he went to Bangkok to live and practice at the Muay Thai gym in the Bang Bon neighbourhood. He changed to professional after being persuaded by
Tepparith Kokietgym. He fought under the same manager as Kokietgym, Kokiet "Sia Ko" Panichayarom of the Kokiet Group. He had trained at Buakaw Banchamek's gym
with Kompayak Porpramook as his partner.

He is currently under the stable of Virat "Sia Nao" Vachirarattanawong's Petchyindee Boxing Promotion, a former stable of his main rival Wanheng Menayothin, with the former Thai national amateur boxer and former WBC world flyweight champion Chatchai Sasakul as a trainer.

Early career
In his fourth professional fight, Pradabsri was scheduled to fight Ardi Tefa for the vacant WBC Asian Continental mini-flyweight title, on 19 November 2014. Pradabsri was the more dominant party, stopping the undefeated Tefa by a fifth-round technical knockout.

Pradabsri was scheduled to make his first title defense against Geboi Mansalayao, on 15 December 2015. The undefeated Pradabsri was the clear favorite over the 10-19-5 Mansalayao. He justified his role as the favorite, winning the fight by unanimous decision. Pradabsri notched two more title defenses, stopping both Ical Tobida on 11 March 2016 and Oscar Raknafa on May 6, 2016 by a sixth-round technical knockout.

On 4 October 2016, Pradabsri was scheduled to fight Heri Amol for the vacant PABA mini-flyweight title. He beat Amol by an eight-round decision. He would go on to defend his title twice, both defenses coming by technical knockout victories over Ellias Nggenggo.

Pradabsri was scheduled to fight Xiong Chaozhong for the vacant WBA International mini-flyweight title. His first and only loss was to Xiong Zhao Zhong, a Chinese boxer who was the former WBC mini-flyweight champion in a fight for the vacant WBA International mini-flyweight title on 3 October 2017 at Datong University, in Datong, China by split decision: 115–113, 116–112, 114–114.

Pradabsri fought Melianus Mirin for the vacant OPBF Silver mini-flyweight title, on 2 May 2018. He won the fight by unanimous decision. He defended the title once, by a sixth-round technical knockout against Stevanus Nana Bau, before vacating the title.

Pradabsri once again fought for the vacant OPBF Silver flyweight title, against Dexter Alimento, on 16 November 2018. He won the fight by a second-round knockout. Pradabsri once again notched a singular title defense before vacating the title, beating Robert Onggocan by a ninth-round technical knockout.

Pradabsri fought for the vacant OPBF Silver light-flyweight title for the third time in his career on 20 December 2019, against Jerry Tomogdan. Pradabsri secured the title by a first-round knockout, stopping Tomogdan after just 69 seconds.

WBC mini-flyweight champion

Pradabsri vs. Wanheng
Pradabsri was scheduled to challenge the reigning WBC mini-flyweight champion Wanheng Menayothin on 27 November 2020, in the latter's 12th consecutive title defense. Pradabsri was at the time the #5 ranked mini-flyweight in the WBC ranking. Wanheng came into the fight as an overwhelming favorite, with one media outlet describing Pradabsri as "a completely padded 34-1, with many of those wins coming against pro debuters and opponents with losing records". Pradabsri got off to a great start, stunning Wanheng with several solid shots in the first round. Wanheng won the second round, but seemed unable to find his rhythm by the end of the fifth round. Pradabsri kept to his outfighting tactics for the remainder of the bout, and won the fight by unanimous decision, with all three judges scoring the fight 115-113 in his favor. It was Wanheng's first loss in 55 professional fights. Pradabsri was then scheduled to fight a non-title bout with Pattharapong Rueangsilanon in Pattharapong's professional debut. He won the fight by a fourth-round technical knockout.

Pradabsri vs. Ngiabphukhiaw
Pradabsri made his first WBC mini flyweight title defense against the Thai national flyweight champion Danai Ngiabphukhiaw. Pradabsri was scheduled to face the #19 ranked WBC mini flyweight contender on 2 November 2021, in Nakhon Sawan, Thailand. He entered the bout as an overwhelming favorite, with most bettors predicting an easy title defense. Pradabsri won the fight by unanimous decision. Two of the judges awarded him a 117-111 scorecard, while the third judge scored it 118-110 in his favor.

Pradabsri vs. Wanheng II
On 7 November 2021, it was revealed that Pradabsri would rematch Wanheng Menayothin on 25 January 2022, in his second WBC mini-flyweight title defense. Pradabsri and Wanheng previously met on 27 November 2020, when Pradabsri handed Wanheng his first professional loss, beating the former champion by unanimous decision. The fight was later postponed for 29 March due to the passing of Pradabsri's father. Pradabsri won the fight by unanimous decision, with all three judges scoring the bout 117–111 in his favor. The bout was closely contested up to the fourth round, with two of the three judges having it as an even 38–38 draw, after which Prababsri began to take over. He dedicated the victory to his father who had passed away earlier.

Pradabsri vs. Tanaka
Pradabsri was expected to make his third title defense against the former OPBF minimumweight champion Tsubasa Koura, who was ranked at #10 by the WBC at the time of the fight's booking. On 16 August, it was announced that Koura would be replaced by the #14 ranked WBC contender Norihito Tanaka. The bout headlined a card which took place in Nakhon Ratchasima, Thailand on 30 August 2022. Pradabsri won the fight by a dominant unanimous decision, with scores of 119–109, 116–112 and 118–110.

Pradabsri vs. Shigeoka
Pradabsri is expected to make his fourth mini-flyweight title defense against the unbeaten Yudai Shigeoka on 16 April 2023, at the Yoyogi National Gymnasium in Tokyo, Japan. The title bout was booked as the main event of "3150Fight Vol. 5", which was broadcast by Abema TV.

Professional boxing record

See also
List of world mini-flyweight boxing champions

References

External links

 

1991 births
Living people
Panya Pradabsri
Panya Pradabsri
Panya Pradabsri
Panya Pradabsri
Mini-flyweight boxers
World mini-flyweight boxing champions
World Boxing Council champions